Spiere-Helkijn is a municipality located in the Belgian province of West Flanders. The municipality comprises the towns of Helkijn and Spiere. On January 1, 2018, Spiere-Helkijn had a total population of 2,087. The total area is 10.78 km² which gives a population density of 194 inhabitants per km².

References

External links

Official website  - Available only in Dutch

Municipalities of West Flanders